Gagarin may refer to Soviet cosmonaut Yuri Gagarin (1934–1968), the first man to travel in outer space.

Gagarin may also refer to:
Gagarin (surname) or Gagarina

Places 
Gagarin, Armenia, a town in Armenia
Gagarin, Smolensk Oblast, a town in Gagarinsky District of Smolensk Oblast, Russia
Gagarin, Uzbekistan, a town in Jizzakh Province, Uzbekistan

Other uses 
Gagarin (crater), a far-side lunar crater, named after Yuri Gagarin
1772 Gagarin, an asteroid, named after Yuri Gagarin
Gagarin: First in Space, a 2013 film
Yuri Gagarin Airport, Moçâmedes, Angola
Kosmonavt Yuri Gagarin, a Soviet satellite tracking ship
Gagarin family, a Rurikid princely family
 "Gagarin", a 2015 song by Public Service Broadcasting from The Race for Space
 "Gagarin", a 2020 song by Moses Sumney from Græ

See also
Gagarin, Russia a list of inhabited localities in Russia
Gagarin Cup, a Kontinental Hockey League trophy
Gagarin Way, a 2001 play by Gregory Burke
Gagarin's Start is a launch site at Baikonur Cosmodrome
Cité Gagarine, housing project in France
Gagarine, 2020 French film
Gagarinsky (disambiguation)